Krys Marshall (born ) is an American actress. She is known for playing the role of astronaut Danielle Poole on the Apple TV+ series For All Mankind.

Early life and education

Marshall grew up in Atlanta, Georgia. She attended the magnet program in performing arts at Pebblebrook High School.

Marshall graduated from the University of North Carolina School of the Arts with a B.F.A. in Drama.

Career

Marshall's first television role was a small part in an episode of Criminal Minds. Her other acting credits include parts on the television series NCIS, Supergirl, and This Is Us. 

Marshall was asked to read for a role on For All Mankind unexpectedly, while auditioning for a different show. She landed the part of Danielle Poole, NASA's first Black astronaut, that same day. Marshall also hosts the companion podcast for the show, the first such audio series to be produced by Apple TV+.

Personal life 

Marshall identifies as pansexual. She is married to Ted Dolan. The couple announced in March 2023 that they are expecting their first child.

References

External links

Living people
1980s births
Year of birth missing (living people)
21st-century African-American women
African-American actresses
American LGBT actors
American television actresses
LGBT African Americans
LGBT people from Georgia (U.S. state)
University of North Carolina School of the Arts alumni